The canton of Touvre-et-Braconne is an administrative division of the Charente department, southwestern France. It was created at the French canton reorganisation which came into effect in March 2015. Its seat is in Ruelle-sur-Touvre.

It consists of the following communes:
Brie
Jauldes
Magnac-sur-Touvre
Mornac
Ruelle-sur-Touvre
Touvre

References

Cantons of Charente